The 1985–86 Eredivisie season was the 26th season of the Eredivisie, the top level of ice hockey in the Netherlands. Nine teams participated in the league, and G.IJ.S. Groningen won the championship.

First round

Final round

External links
Nederlandse IJshockey Bond

Neth
Eredivisie (ice hockey) seasons
Ere